USS Passaconaway (YN-114/AN-86) – sometimes called USS Skakamaxon -- was a  which was assigned to protect United States Navy ships and harbors during World War II with her anti-submarine nets. Her World War II career was short due to the war coming to an end, but, post-war, she continued salvage operations, including those at Bikini Atoll, before being struck from the Navy in 1947.

Construction and career 
Shakamaxon (AN-88) was laid down on 30 June 1944 by the Leathem D. Smith Shipbuilding Company, of Sturgeon Bay, Wisconsin; launched on 9 September 1944; sponsored by Mrs. Theodore E. Layman; and commissioned on 5 April 1945.

World War II service 
Shakamaxon completed fitting out at the Boston Navy Yard, then conducted shakedown off the New England coast before commencing post-shakedown availability at Boston, Massachusetts. The auxiliary net-laying ship was assigned to the U.S. Pacific Fleet for duty in July 1945.

Post-war service 
By March 1946, she was at Guam in the Mariana Islands and, from there, moved to Bikini Atoll in the Marshall Islands for Operation Crossroads, the atomic bomb tests. She remained at Bikini from 25 May until 23 July, when she put to sea.

Shakamaxon arrived at Kwajalein on 28 August and stayed until early September. She put to sea again for a time and then made for Guam on 13 September. She made a trip to Tinian on that date and returned to Guam, where she remained until 14 October. Shakamaxon arrived in Pearl Harbor on 29 October and did not depart until 16 January 1947.

Inactivation 
From there, she voyaged to San Diego, California, for inactivation overhaul. On 21 April 1947, the auxiliary net-laying ship entered the Pacific Reserve Fleet at San Diego. She remained out of commission, in reserve, until 1 July 1963 when her name was struck from the Naval Vessel Register and transferred to the U.S. Maritime Administration for lay-up.

Transfer to the Department of the Interior 
She was reacquired in 1968 and transferred to the U.S. Department of Interior, for which she served as a cargo carrier in Micronesia. Her ultimate fate is unknown.

References 
 
 NavSource Online: Service Ship Photo Archive - YN-114 / AN-88 Skakamaxon

 

Cohoes-class net laying ships
Ships built in Sturgeon Bay, Wisconsin
1944 ships
World War II net laying ships of the United States